Money for Nothing is a 1932 British comedy film directed by Monty Banks and starring Seymour Hicks, Betty Stockfeld and Edmund Gwenn. It was produced by British International Pictures and shot at the company's Elstree Studios near London. A French-language remake of the film Love and Luck, also directed by Banks, premiered later in the year.

Synopsis
The screenplay concerns a penniless gambler who is mistaken for a very wealthy man in Monte Carlo.

Cast
 Seymour Hicks as Jay Cheddar
 Betty Stockfeld as Joan Blossom
 Edmund Gwenn as Sir Henry Blossom
 Donald Calthrop as Manager
 Henry Wenman as Jay Cheddar
 Philip Strange as Jackson
 Amy Veness as Emma Bolt
 Charles Farrell as Digger
 Mike Johnson as Waiter
 Hal Gordon as Waiter
 Renee Gadd as Maid

References

Bibliography
 Low, Rachael. Filmmaking in 1930s Britain. George Allen & Unwin, 1985.
 Wood, Linda. British Films, 1927-1939. British Film Institute, 1986.

External links

1932 films
Films shot at British International Pictures Studios
Films directed by Monty Banks
1932 comedy films
Films set in Monaco
British comedy films
British multilingual films
British black-and-white films
1932 multilingual films
1930s English-language films
1930s British films